Uparli Badol is a village in Kangra District in Himachal Pradesh

References

Villages in Kangra district